The VII 2010 Oceania Badminton Championships was the 7th tournament of the Oceania Badminton Championships. It was held in Invercargill, New Zealand from 24 to 27 February 2010.

Venue
The tournament was held at Stadium Southland in Invercargill, New Zealand.

Medalists

Individual event
The table below gives an overview of the individual event medal winners at the 2010 Oceania Championships.

Team Event

References

External links
 Individual Results

Oceania Badminton Championships
Oceania Badminton Championships
Oceania Badminton Championships
Oceania Badminton Championships
International sports competitions hosted by New Zealand
Sport in Invercargill
February 2010 sports events in New Zealand